This is a list of cases reported in volume 109 of United States Reports, decided by the Supreme Court of the United States in 1883 and 1884.

Justices of the Supreme Court at the time of volume 109 U.S. 

The Supreme Court is established by Article III, Section 1 of the Constitution of the United States, which says: "The judicial Power of the United States, shall be vested in one supreme Court . . .". The size of the Court is not specified; the Constitution leaves it to Congress to set the number of justices. Under the Judiciary Act of 1789 Congress originally fixed the number of justices at six (one chief justice and five associate justices). Since 1789 Congress has varied the size of the Court from six to seven, nine, ten, and back to nine justices (always including one chief justice).

When the cases in volume 109 U.S. were decided the Court comprised the following nine members:

Notable Cases in 109 U.S.

Civil Rights Cases 
The Civil Rights Cases, 3 (1883), were a group of five cases in which the Supreme Court held that the Thirteenth and Fourteenth Amendments did not empower Congress to outlaw racial discrimination by private individuals. The holding regarding the 13th Amendment was overturned by the Court in the 1968 case Jones v. Alfred H. Mayer Co. The holding regarding the 14th Amendment not applying to private entities is still valid precedent, but in the 1964 case Heart of Atlanta Motel, Inc. v. United States, the Supreme Court held that Congress could prohibit racial discrimination by private actors via another part of the Constitution, the Commerce Clause.

The only dissenting justice in the Civil Rights Cases, John Marshall Harlan, correctly predicted the decision's negative long-term consequences: it put an end to the attempts by Radical Republicans to ensure the civil rights of blacks, and triggered widespread segregation in housing, employment, and public life that confined them to second-class citizenship throughout much of the United States until the passage of civil rights legislation in the 1960s in the wake of the Civil Rights Movement.

Ex Parte Crow Dog 
Ex parte Crow Dog, 556 (1883), was a Supreme Court decision that followed the death of one member of a Native American tribe at the hands of another on reservation land. Crow Dog was a member of the Brulé band of the Lakota Sioux. On August 5, 1881 he shot and killed Spotted Tail, a Lakota chief. The tribal council dealt with the incident according to Sioux tradition, and Crow Dog paid restitution to the dead man's family. However, the U.S. authorities then prosecuted Crow Dog for murder in a federal court. He was found guilty and sentenced to hang. He petitioned the Supreme Court for a writ of habeas corpus, arguing that the federal court had no jurisdiction to try cases when the offense had already been tried by the tribal council. The Court found in his favor and Crow Dog was released. The case led to the Major Crimes Act in 1885, which placed some major crimes (initially seven, now 15) under federal jurisdiction if committed by a Native American against another Native American on a reservation or on tribal land.

Citation style 

Under the Judiciary Act of 1789 the federal court structure at the time comprised District Courts, which had general trial jurisdiction; Circuit Courts, which had mixed trial and appellate (from the US District Courts) jurisdiction; and the United States Supreme Court, which had appellate jurisdiction over the federal District and Circuit courts—and for certain issues over state courts. The Supreme Court also had limited original jurisdiction (i.e., in which cases could be filed directly with the Supreme Court without first having been heard by a lower federal or state court). There were one or more federal District Courts and/or Circuit Courts in each state, territory, or other geographical region.

Bluebook citation style is used for case names, citations, and jurisdictions.
 e.g.,"C.C.D.N.J." = United States Circuit Court for the District of New Jersey
 e.g.,"D. Mass." = United States District Court for the District of Massachusetts
 "E." = Eastern; "M." = Middle; "N." = Northern; "S." = Southern; "W." = Western
 e.g.,"C.C.S.D.N.Y." = United States Circuit Court for the Southern District of New York
 e.g.,"M.D. Ala." = United States District Court for the Middle District of Alabama
 "Ct. Cl." = United States Court of Claims
 The abbreviation of a state's name alone indicates the highest appellate court in that state's judiciary at the time.
 e.g.,"Pa." = Supreme Court of Pennsylvania
 e.g.,"Me." = Supreme Judicial Court of Maine

List of cases in volume 109 U.S.

Notes and references

External links 
  Case reports in volume 109 from Library of Congress
  Case reports in volume 109 from Court Listener
  Case reports in volume 109 from the Caselaw Access Project of Harvard Law School
  Case reports in volume 109 from Google Scholar
  Case reports in volume 109 from Justia
  Case reports in volume 109 from Open Jurist
 Website of the United States Supreme Court
 United States Courts website about the Supreme Court
 National Archives, Records of the Supreme Court of the United States
 American Bar Association, How Does the Supreme Court Work?
 The Supreme Court Historical Society

1883 in United States case law
1884 in United States case law